= Angelia Trinidad =

American businesswoman and social entrepreneur

- Born: September 17, 1990 (age 35)
- Education: University of California, Los Angeles
- Occupations: Founder and CEO, Passion Planner

Angelia "Angel" R. Trinidad (born September 17, 1990) is an American businesswoman and social entrepreneur. She is the founder and CEO of Passion Planner.
